Crosby station could refer to:

 Crosby station (Minnesota), a historic train station in Crosby, Minnesota, United States
 Crosby railway station, a closed railway station on the Isle of Man
 Blundellsands & Crosby railway station, a railway station in Merseyside, England, United Kingdom